Cosmosoma plutona is a moth of the subfamily Arctiinae. It was described by William Schaus in 1894. It is found in Brazil.

References

plutona
Moths described in 1894